Rudolf Gellesch (1 May 1914 – 20 August 1990) was a German football forward. Gellesch played for FC Schalke 04 (1926–1946) and TuS Lübbecke (1946–1950).

On the national level he played for Germany national team (20 matches/1 goal), and was a participant at the 1938 FIFA World Cup. He was the inside right of the Breslau Eleven, that beat Denmark 8-0 in Breslau, in 1937 and went on to win 10 out 11 games played during that year. He was also part of Germany's squad at the 1936 Summer Olympics, but he did not play in any matches.

One of the many talents emanating from FC Schalke 04 during the 1930s, young Rudolf Gellesch replaced Fritz Szepan as inside forward, after Szepan had moved to the center half position. Being a talented threader of moves on the pitch, he appeared to be a double of Szepan.

Selected filmography
 Das Grosse Spiel (1942)

References

External links
 
 
 

1914 births
1990 deaths
Sportspeople from Gelsenkirchen
German footballers
Germany international footballers
FC Schalke 04 players
1938 FIFA World Cup players
German football managers
KSV Hessen Kassel managers
Association football midfielders
Footballers from North Rhine-Westphalia